The Beginning of Times is the tenth studio album by Finnish metal band Amorphis, released on 25 May 2011 in Finland, 27 May in Europe and 7 June in the United States. Like previous Amorphis albums, The Beginning of Times, is a concept album. The central character of the songs is Väinämöinen, described by the band as "the iconic hero of Finnish mythology".

Release

Singles
On 11 April 2011, Amorphis premiered the first single "You I Need" on their Facebook page. It was released digitally in Finland on 20 April 2011, and in other countries on 22 April 2011. Early the next month, the band released another new song, "My Enemy", again on Facebook.

Reception

The Beginning of Times had a strong sales debut week, charting at No. 1 on the Finnish Albums Chart and No. 16 on the German Media Control Charts.

In a professional review for PopMatters, Adrien Begrand praised the album, going so far as to say that Amorphis have never sounded better with their current line-up and describes the album as "a slick, classy blend of death metal and melodic hard rock". Amateur reviews have also been positive, with Craig Hartranft of DangerDog proclaiming "The Beginning of Times finds Amorphis in grand form, doing what they do best".

Track listing

Personnel

Amorphis
Tomi Joutsen – vocals
Esa Holopainen – lead guitar
Tomi Koivusaari – rhythm guitar
Niclas Etelävuori – bass guitar
Santeri Kallio – keyboards; synthesizers; piano; organ
Jan Rechberger – drums

Additional personnel
Savotta Choir – additional male vocals
Netta Dahlberg – additional female vocals
Iikka Kahri – flute, clarinet & saxophone
Marko Hietala - vocals production
Mikko Karmila - mixing
Travis Smith - cover art
Pekka Kainulainen - lyrics

Additional personnel 2
Erkki Virta - lyric translation
Sami Koivisto - engineering
Thomas Ewerhard - layout
Svante Forsbäck - mastering
Stefan de Batselier - photography

Charts

References

2011 albums
Amorphis albums
Albums with cover art by Travis Smith (artist)
Music based on the Kalevala